The Toro Company  is an American company based in the Minneapolis suburb of Bloomington, Minnesota that designs, manufactures, and markets lawn mowers, snow blowers, and irrigation system supplies for commercial and residential, agricultural, and public sector uses.

History
The company was established as the "Toro Motor Company" in 1914 to build tractor engines for The Bull Tractor Company. In 1948, Toro entered the push mower market, acquiring Whirlwind Corp. They sold push mowers under this name for several years. In 1952, the Whirlwind's factory in Windom, Minnesota was closed.

In 1986 Toro acquired the Wheel Horse Products Division of American Motors Corporation (AMC). Wheel Horse manufactured lawn and garden tractors as well as riding lawn mowers. The division was spun off from AMC for $8 million so that the automaker could maintain focus on vehicles.

Lawn and garden tractors were then marketed under the Toro, Wheel Horse, and Toro Wheel Horse names. Acquisitions continued with the purchase of Lawn-Boy in 1989 from Outboard Marine Corporation.

In the 1990s, then CEO Kendrick Melrose changed the company's strategy, shifting its focus to golf courses, sports fields, municipal parks, and commercial properties. The company acquired James Hardie Irrigation in 1996, Exmark Manufacturing in 1997, Hayter in 2005, Rain Master Irrigation Systems, and Turf Guard Wireless Monitoring Technology in 2007.

In 2007 almost 70 percent of the company's sales came from professional markets, versus one-third in 1990. In 2007, the low-end lawn and garden tractor product manufacturing was outsourced to MTD Products, to be sold at Home Depot stores. Toro discontinued its Wheel Horse models and retired the brand name in 2007. Products and other brands expanded with Toro's purchases of TYCROP Manufacturing turf equipment product line in 2009 and USPraxis in 2010.

In 2014, the snowplow and snow removal equipment company Boss Products was purchased by Toro.

On February 15, 2019, Toro announced that it has reached an agreement to acquire privately held The Charles Machine Works, the parent company of Ditch Witch and MTI Equipment and other brands, for $700 million.

In May 2022, Toro announced it was bringing an automated robotic mower to market in spring 2023.

Brands
The company's products are marketed under several brands:
Toro – irrigation systems & supplies, professional and consumer mowers, compact utility equipment, snow blowers, and handheld trimmers and leaf blowers
Toro Ag – agriculture professional microirrigation systems, such as driplines, driptapes and sprayers for professional agriculture applications
Boss Snowplow – snow and ice removal
Charles Machine Works – Includes the following brands
Ditch Witch – 
Radius –
American Augers –
Subsite –
Trencor –
HammerHead –
 Dingo – compact heavy duty hydraulic equipment
eXmark – commercial mowers
Hayter (United Kingdom) – consumer and professional mowers.
Intimidator Group – utility vehicles and mowers
Irritrol Systems – irrigation systems for residential and commercial landscapes
Lawn-Boy – consumer mowers
Lawn Genie – consumer irrigation
Pope Products (Australia) – garden maintenance equipment
Unique Lighting – low voltage landscape lighting
Ventrac - tractors for maintenance and lawning

References

Agricultural machinery manufacturers of the United States
Lawn mower manufacturers
Snow removal
Lawn and garden tractors
Irrigation in the United States
Manufacturing companies based in Minnesota
Companies based in Bloomington, Minnesota
Manufacturing companies established in 1914
1914 establishments in Minnesota
Companies listed on the New York Stock Exchange
Irrigation companies